Curubandé is a district of the Liberia canton, in the Guanacaste province of Costa Rica.

History 
Curubandé was created on 26 November 1971 by Decreto Ejecutivo 2077-G. Segregated from Liberia.

Geography 
Curubandé has an area of  km² and an elevation of  metres.

Villages
Administrative center of the district is Cereceda. Other villages are Colorado and Curubandé.

Demographics 

For the 2011 census, Curubandé had a population of  inhabitants.

Transportation

Road transportation 
The district is covered by the following road routes:
 National Route 1

Economy
In recent years, Curubandé has become a center of tourism within Costa Rica. This is due in large part to the nearby Rincon de la Vieja National Park. 

Curubandé is also the site of Las Pailas Geothermal Central, a large geothermal power plant that is being built to provide a large portion of Costa Rica's electric energy needs.

References 

Districts of Guanacaste Province
Populated places in Guanacaste Province